Royapettah metro station is a metro railway station on the Purple Line of the Chennai Metro. The station is among the underground stations along corridor III of the Chennai Metro, Madhavaram Milk Colony–Siruseri Sipcot 2 stretch. The station serves the neighbourhoods of Royapettah, Triplicane, and Gopalapuram.

History
Construction of the station began in October 2021. The old YMCA building was demolished for the construction purpose, and the entrance and exit points of the station would be built on 239 square meters of land.

See also
 List of Chennai metro stations
 Railway stations in Chennai
 Transport in Chennai
 Urban rail transit in India
 List of metro systems

References

External links

 
 UrbanRail.Net – descriptions of all metro systems in the world, each with a schematic map showing all stations.

Chennai Metro stations
Railway stations in Chennai